Eastport was a railroad station built on the former Manorville Branch of the Long Island Rail Road in Eastport, New York. It was opened in 1870 and closed in 1958. It was the easternmost station along both branches in the Town of Brookhaven.

History
Originally named "Moriches station" for the nearby towns of Moriches, Center Moriches and East Moriches, despite being located east of the Moricheses, the station was built in March 1870 on the southeast corner of the at-grade crossing of Montauk Highway for what was then the Sag Harbor Branch of the Long Island Railroad. The Sag Harbor Branch was built by Oliver Charlick to prevent the South Side Railroad of Long Island from extending east of Patchogue.

The former South Side Railroad of Long Island main line was extended to Eastport Station on July 27, 1881 after eventual acquisition by the LIRR. On October 18 of that year, it was moved to the southwest corner of Montauk Highway and East Moriches Road (now Boulevard), and renamed "Eastport." It also included a wye between eastbound and westbound trains that went over a bridge over Montauk Highway. When the Montauk Extension was finally built east of Bridgehampton station, Eastport station officially became the hub of the Manorville Branch and Montauk Branch. From 1916–1938, the junction of these two lines contained the PT Cabins.

The west leg of the wye to the Manorville Branch was abandoned in 1931. The PT Cabins were replaced by automated switches and signals. The branch itself was abandoned in 1949. Along with East Moriches station just southwest of here, Eastport station was closed by the LIRR on October 6, 1958, and was moved to a private location in 1959. However, it continues to serve as a hub of local farming freight for decades afterwards.

References

External links
Babylon/Montauk Branch Stations (LIRR Unofficial History Website)
TrainsAreFun.com
Manorville Branch maps and photos from 1949 and earlier
Eastport Freight Sidings
Manorville(Sag Harbor) Branch (Arrt's Arrchives)
PSC Decision Brings Up Colorful History of B'haven, E'port, EM Stations (Patchogue Advance; September 25, 1958)

Former Long Island Rail Road stations in Suffolk County, New York
Brookhaven, New York
Railway stations in the United States opened in 1870
Railway stations closed in 1958
1958 disestablishments in New York (state)
1870 establishments in New York (state)